Abraham P. Holmes was a state legislator in South Carolina. He represented Colleton County in the South Carolina House of Representatives from 1870 to 1874. He was described as "mulatto". He was honored in a legislative resolution as an African American.

See also
African-American officeholders during and following the Reconstruction era

References

Year of birth missing
Members of the South Carolina House of Representatives
People from Colleton County, South Carolina
African-American state legislators in South Carolina
African-American politicians during the Reconstruction Era
Year of death missing